Paduka Sri Sultan Mansur Shah I ibni Almarhum Sultan Muzaffar Shah I (died 1577) was the second Sultan of Perak. He was the son of the first Sultan of Perak, Sultan Muzaffar Shah I and Tun Terang, daughter of Tun Fatimah and Tun Ali.

Perak-Siamese Relations 
According to Sejarah Raja Perak, there was a time when Mansur accompanied by Bendahara Megat Terawis went to Ulu Perak and established the northern border of Perak with Reman. The boundary was marked by Mansur on a large stone in a place called Tapong and the large stone which was used as a boundary stone was named Batu Belah. It is said that the split stone that was used as a boundary stone was split by Mansur using his sword. The determination of the boundaries was agreed by the King of Reman and that was the boundary between the Perak Sultanate and the Kingdom of Reman until the end of the 18th century.

The tin mines around the Kelian Intan area in Ulu Perak are included in Perak and Sultan Mansur Shah I appointed a representative to collect taxes from the miners. Since then, Perak began to develop and become rich due to tax collection from the tin mines around Perak, especially from the Kelian Intan area.

During his reign, the Siamese had come to attack Perak. Soldiers from Siam had landed at Pangkalan Lumut and had fought with the people of Perak under the leadership of the son-in-law of Mansur named Raja Ali. In the end, Perak lost to Siam and Raja Ali was killed in the area that is now known as Setiawan. Since then, the state of Perak began sending Bunga Emas to the Siamese government every year as a tribute and the Perak government allowed the Siamese to buy tin without charging any tax.

Perak-Acehnese Relations 
According to Sejarah Aceh, during the reign of Sultan Ali Riayat Shah I, who is also known as Sultan Hussain who ruled the Aceh Sultanate from 1568/71 to 1575, the Acehnese army came to attack and defeat Perak in 1573. Sultan Mansur Shah I and his wife and son were captured and taken to Aceh. Upon reaching Aceh, the eldest son of Sultan Mansur Shah I named Raja Alauddin was married to an Acehnese princess named Raja Putri. When there were no adult descendents of Sultan Ali Mughayat Shah, Raja Alauddin was made the Sultan of Aceh with the title of Sultan Alauddin Mansur Shah.

Not long after that, Mansur was sent back by the government of Aceh to Perak to occupy the throne, which became a subject of Aceh.

However, in Sejarah Raja Perak, it is stated that Sultan Mansur Shah I was not actually captured and was not taken to Aceh together with his family. On the other hand, only one of his sons was brought and after being appointed Sultan of Aceh, only then did the Sultan of Aceh send his people to take his father, Sultan Mansur Shah I, to Aceh.

Before Sultan Mansur Shah was brought to Aceh, he married the daughter of a Batin (Indigenous Chief) in Kuala Kinta and from the offspring of Mansur's son with an indigenous woman it is said that the "Panglima Kinta", the Orang Besar of Perak in the Kinta District was born.

Death 
What is generally known, Sultan Mansur Shah I died in the state of Perak in the year 1577 which the story passed down from generation to generation regarding his death is quite mysterious. The story of the death of Mansur is not officially known and it is only said that he disappeared after performing Friday prayers at the Kota Lama Kanan Mosque. Ever since the incident of the Sultan of Perak disappearing after Friday prayers, the people began to think that Mansur had passed away and he had been given the title of Marhum Kota Lama Kanan.

In 1916 during the reign of Sultan Idris I Murshidul Azzam Shah (the 28th Sultan of Perak), a mosque was rebuilt on the site of the Kota Lama Kanan Mosque in commemoration of Sultan Mansur Shah I and a tombstone was placed in the first row of the mosque.

References 

Sultans of Perak
1577 deaths
Royal House of Perak
Malay people
People of Malay descent
Muslim monarchs
Sultans
Sunni monarchs
People from Perak